The Annie Award for Character Animation in a Video Game is an Annie Award given annually to the best character animation in video games. It was first presented at the 42nd Annie Awards.

Winners and nominees

2010s

2020s

Notes

References

External links 
 Annie Awards: Legacy

Annie Awards
Video game awards